Eugène Bergès was a French fencer, maréchal des logis in French Army. He competed in the individual foil event at the 1900 Summer Olympics.

References

External links
 

Year of birth missing
Year of death missing
French male foil fencers
Olympic fencers of France
Fencers at the 1900 Summer Olympics
Place of birth missing
Place of death missing